Christopher Ward (born 18 March 1980) is a British conductor. In August 2018 he became the Music Director of Theater Aachen.

Career
Christopher Ward studied at Oxford University (Musicology) and the Guildhall School of Music and Drama, London (Conducting and Piano). During this time, he worked with Oxford University Philharmonia and Chorus, Oxford Bach Choir, New Chamber Opera and The Arcadian Singers.

In 2003, Ward was awarded the position of Répétiteur Fellow at Scottish Opera and the RSAMD, Glasgow, working with Sir Richard Armstrong, Richard Farnes, and Timothy Dean.

In 2004, Ward spent a period working at the Internationales Opernstudio at Zürich Opera.

Christopher Ward moved to Germany in 2005 to work as Kapellmeister at Staatstheater Kassel. Working as music staff on a range of repertoire, he led productions of Donizetti's L'Elisir d'Amore, Porpora's Il Gedeone, Loewe's My Fair Lady, Weill's Die Sieben Todsünden, Ullmann's Der Kaiser von Atlantis, Krenek's Das Geheime Königreich, the world premiere of Beaudoin's Himmelfahrt, Rotkäppchen, Lauf! (Müller-Wieland's Rotkäppchens Schlaflied, Schmitt's Im Korb, Kühnl's In Rotkäppchens Bett, Seither's Der helle Rand von Furcht und Erwachen), Gershwin's Blue Monday, Bernstein's Trouble in Tahiti, Martinu's Hlas Lesa and Streul's Spuk im Händelhaus, and conducted performances of Verdi's Simon Boccanegra, Mozart's Le Nozze di Figaro, Humperdinck's Hänsel und Gretel, Offenbach's Les Contes d'Hoffmann, Händel's Hercules, Lehár's Der Graf von Luxemburg, Suppé's Banditenstreiche and Porter's Anything Goes. During this time, he has also conducted the Staatsorchester Kassel in a range of concerts as well as directing the theatre's annual youth orchestra project (TJO).

In 2006, Ward assisted Sir Simon Rattle and the Berlin Philharmonic in a production of Wagner's Das Rheingold at the Aix-en-Provence Music Festival. He continued this association in Berlin and Salzburg (Easter Festival 2007).

From 2009 to 2013, Christopher Ward was Kapellmeister and Assistant to Kent Nagano at the Bayerische Staatsoper. He led new productions of Rossini's La Cenerentola, Haydn's La fedeltá premiata and Janacek's The Cunning Little Vixen, and world premieres of Eötvös' Die Tragödie des Teufels, Ronchetti's Narrenschiffe and Srnka's Make No Noise (opening the International Munich Summer Opera Festival with Ensemble Modern). Moreover, he conducted concerts with the Bayerische Staatsorchester, the Opera Studios of Munich and La Scala Milan, Orchesterakademie and Jungen Münchner Philharmonie.

As guest conductor, he has directed performances at the Hamburgische Staatsoper (Mozart's "Le nozze di Figaro"), Deutsche Oper am Rhein (Verdi's "La Traviata"), Komische Oper, Berlin (Mozart's "Le nozze di Figaro"), Staatstheater Braunschweig (Verdi's "Rigoletto"), Salzburger Landestheater (Rossini's "Il Barbiere di Siviglia"), Musiktheater im Revier Gelsenkirchen (Saint-Saen's Samson et Dalila), Staatstheater Mainz (Verdi's Un ballo in maschera), GHT Theater, Görlitz (Verdi's La Traviata), Theater Augsburg (Puccini's La Bohème), Staatstheater Darmstadt (Puccini's Madama Butterfly) and Hochschule für Musik Saar (Gluck's Iphigénie en Tauride) as well as conducting concerts with the Staatsorchester Braunschweig, Cottbus Philharmonic, Neue Lausitz Philharmonic and Altenburg-Gera Philharmonic orchestras. He recently directed the world premiere of Ľubica Čekovská's opera Dorian Gray as part of ISCM World New Music Days Festival 2013 at the Slovak National Theatre, Bratislava, performing it also at the Prague Spring International Music Festival 2015.

In 2014, Christopher Ward became 1st Kapellmeister at the Saarländisches Staatstheater. Here he has already led new productions of Ravel's L'Enfant et les Sortilèges and Daphnis et Chloé, Rimsky-Korsakov's The Golden Cockerel, Haas' Bluthaus, Rameau's Platée, Dvořák's Rusalka, Verdi's Rigoletto and several new ballet productions (Grieg's/Sæverud's Peer Gynt, Inger Celis Eckmann, Kylián Celis Chaix). He has also conducted a range of symphonic concerts as well as performances of Donizetti's Lucia da Lammermoor, Verdi's Macbeth and Un ballo in maschera, and Mozart's Don Giovanni.

In the 2016/17 season, he conducts new productions of Weber's Der Freischütz and Verdi's Simon Boccanegra, a ballet evening including Stravinsky's Pulcinella as well as revivals of Verdi's Falstaff and Rossini's Il Barbiere di Siviglia.

References

External links
 Christopher Ward official website
 Portrait on the Saarländisches Staatstheater website
 Christopher Ward on Operabase
 Christopher Ward on YouTube

1980 births
Living people
Place of birth missing (living people)
Alumni of the University of Oxford
Alumni of the Guildhall School of Music and Drama
British male conductors (music)
21st-century British conductors (music)
21st-century British male musicians